Exposition is the debut album by the band Wax on Radio.

Track listing

 "Today I Became a Realist" - 5:37
 "Time Will Bind Us to the Guilt of Commitment" - 5:54
 "Remembering" - 5:57
 "Guilding the Lily" - 5:13
 "The General of Medicine City" - 5:27
 "Dawn Architects" - 4:02
 "When in Rome..." - 7:45
 "The Devil" - 7:05
 "Give Me a Place to Stand and I Will Move the Earth" - 7:46

Personnel

Band
Mikey Russell – vocals, guitar
Bob Buckstaff – guitar, Wurlitzer, tambourine
Harrison Taylor – bass guitar, bells
Sammy Del Real – drums, percussion

Other Personnel
Mathieu Lejeune – engineer
Will Brierre – assistant engineer
Steve Hall – mastering
Mark Needham – mixing
Justin Perkins – drum engineering

External links
Exposition @ amazon.com retrieved 11-12-07
Exposition @ Bliiboard.com retrieved 11-12-07

Wax on Radio albums
2006 debut albums